Secrets of the Super Psychics was a Channel 4 documentary special in the UK, first shown in the Equinox strand in 1997, later reformatted as a shorter The Learning Channel episode in 1998: "Viewers eager to know more about the differences between science and claptrap should tune in".

The 90-minute film, made by Open Media, was first shown in the UK under the title Secrets of the Psychics.

The Times said the documentary "...cast an enjoyably sceptical eye over 150 years of the paranormal". David Aaronovitch described it in The Independent on Sunday as
a programme which showed two things very clearly. First that there are – and have always been – some extremely clever and ruthless illusionists out there. And – second – that there is an exceptional desire to believe that what these hoaxers tell us is actually true.
Simon Hoggart wrote in The Spectator that this was
the first show ever to take on the notoriously litigious Uri Geller. They showed how all his parlour tricks could be easily duplicated by jobbing magicians without any help from paranormal powers.
In 1998 the Broadcasting Standards Commission in the United Kingdom rejected a complaint made by Uri Geller, saying that it "wasn't unfair to have magicians showing how they duplicate those 'psychic feats'." The full text of the BSC adjudication is available on the internet at the Open Media website.

References

External links
 From the University of Edinburgh Psychology Video Library: dates of transmission  and programme description 
  – about Uri Geller
 

Channel 4 original programming
Documentary films about the paranormal
Equinox (TV series)
Faith healers
Scientific skepticism mass media
1997 television specials